The 1990 Jordanian  League (known as The Jordanian  League,   was the 40th season of Jordan League since its inception in 1944. Al-Faysali  won its  23rd league title .

Teams

Map

Overview
Al-Faysali won the championship.
Al-Ramtha Withdrew from the return stage.

League standings

References
RSSSF

Jordanian Pro League seasons
Jordan
Jordan
football